NHL on Hughes is the de facto name of a TV program that broadcast National Hockey League games on the defunct independent Hughes Television Network during the 1979–80 season. The program aired under the title The NHL '80. Hughes broadcast Thursday night games, the All-Star Game, some playoff games, and the first five games of the Stanley Cup Finals (the final game, Game 6, was broadcast by CBS). Hughes and the USA cable network technically, used CBC's Hockey Night in Canada feeds for the American coverage of the first five games of the Stanley Cup Finals. The first broadcast involved the Atlanta Flames against the Chicago Blackhawks on January 25.

Playoff coverage

Stanley Cup Finals
Videos:

References

Hughes Television Network
Hughes
1980 American television series debuts
1980 American television series endings